Shintaro Matsukura is a Japanese kickboxer fighting out of Tokyo, Japan. He is the current WPMF World Super Middleweight champion.

Career
On March 2, 2008 Matsukura participated to the K-1 tryouts, he passed every steps and was selected by the officials including K-1 youth development director Kensaku Maeda.

Matsukura turned professional on July 20, 2008 at the MAJKF BREAK THROUGH 5 event. He was defeated by unanimous decision against Kenichi Hashimoto.
Matsukura returned to amateur competition when he participated to the 2009 K-1 Koshien -70kg tournament. Matsukura won the tournament, defeating three opponents in the same day.

On March 27, 2010 Matsukura faced  Yuuki at K-1 WORLD MAX 2010 ～-70kg Japan Tournament～. He won the fight by knockout in the second round after flooring his opponent three times.

In 2010 Matsukura participated to the annual New Year's eve event of japanese combat sport combining MMA and kickboxing called World Victory Road Presents: Soul of Fight. He lost to Yusuke Ike by knockout in the second round.

On July 7, 2011 Matsukura took part in a one night 4-man tournament for the inaugural Krush Championship. He lost in the semi final against Yutaro Yamauchi by split decision after an extra round.
On September 25, 2011 Matsukura faced Yuya Yamamoto in the quarter final of the K-1 MAX Japan 70kg Tournament. He lost the fight by unanimous decision. 

On September 9, 2012 Matsukura took part in the Krush Youth Grand Prix at 70kg. In a fight serving as the semi final bout he defeated Kazuya Akimoto by extra round knockout. The final happened at Krush 24 on November 10, Matsukura Taisei Kondo by extra round knockout to win the Grand Prix.

On January 14, 2013 Matsukura took part in the Krush Grand Prix 2013. In the Quarter Final bout he defeated Keita Makihira by unanimous decision. In the semi final he lost Yuta Kubo by unanimous decision.

Matsukura faced Yoshihiro Sato at Krush. 2 in Nagoya on September 1, 2013. He lost by unanimous decision.

On November 3, 2014 Matsukura was booked against Jiao Fukai on the first event of the version of K-1 at K-1 World GP 2014 -65kg Championship Tournament. He wno the fight by unanimous decision.

On February 6, 2015 Matsukura took part in a Krush tournament for the vacant 70kg title. He lost in the semi final to Hiroki Nakajima by unanimous decision. 

On April 24, 2016 Matsukura faced Kazuya Akimoto at K-1 World GP 2016 -60kg Japan Tournament. He was defeated by majority decision.

On December 3, 2016 Matsukura traveled to China to compete on Wu Lin Feng 2016: WLF x Krush - China vs Japan. He defeated Zhao Yan by unanimous decision.

On February 25, 2017 Matsukura faced Hinata at K-1 World GP 2017 Lightweight Championship Tournament. He lost the fight by unanimous decision.

On March 11, 2018 Matsukura took part in the 2018 Kunlun Fight 70 kg World Championship qualifying tournament at Kunlun Fight 70. In the semi final bout he lost to Hu Yafei by majority decision.

On June 18, 2018 Matsukura made his RISE promotional debut at RISE 125. He lost to Lee Sung-hyun by extra round unanimous decision.

On July 5, 2019 Matsukura rematched Lee Sung-hyun for the vacant RISE Middleweight title. He lost the fight by unanimous decision after five rounds.

On September 19, 2020 Matsukura faced Kouki for the vacant WPMF World Super Middleweight title at Suk Wan Kingtong "Go for the top". Matsukura won by knockout in the first round to become the new champion. 

On March 13, 2021 Matsukura took part in the KNOCK Black inaugural Middleweight championship tournament. He defeated Kohei Tokeshi by first round knockout in the semi final. In the final happening on July 18 at KNOCK OUT 2021 vol.3 Matsukura defeated Hijiri Tamura by unanimous decision to capture the title.

On March 3, 2022 it was announced Matsukura relinquished the KNOCK OUT Black Middleweight title following his departure from TRY HARD Gym and signature to the K-1 promotion. For his return to K-1 Matsukura faced Julio Cesar Mori at K-1: K'Festa 5 on April 3, 2022. He won the fight by unanimous decision.

Matsukura faced Katsuya Jinbo at K-1 World GP 2022 Yokohamatsuri on September 11, 2022. He lost the fight by a fourth-round knockout.

Matsukura faced Igor Silva at K-1 World GP 2023: K'Festa 6 on March 12, 2023. He won the fight by a second-round knockout.

Titles and accomplishments

Professional
KNOCK OUT
 2021 KNOCK OUT Black Super Middleweight Champion 

World Professional Muaythai Federation
 2020 WPMF World Super Middleweight Champion

Krush
 2012 Krush Youth GP -70kg Champion

Amateur
K-1
 2009 K-1 Koshien Tournament -70kg Champion

Fight record

|- style="background:#cfc;"
| 2023-03-12 || Win||align=left| Igor Silva || K-1 World GP 2023: K'Festa 6 || Tokyo, Japan || KO (Right cross)|| 2 ||2:25 
|-  style="text-align:center; background:#fbb;"
| 2022-09-11 ||Loss || align=left| Katsuya Jinbo ||  K-1 World GP 2022 Yokohamatsuri  || Yokohama, Japan || Ext.R KO (Right cross)  || 4 || 2:10
|-
|- style="background:#cfc" 
| 2022-04-03 || Win||align=left| Julio Cesar Mori || K-1: K'Festa 5 || Tokyo, Japan || Decision (Unanimous) || 3 ||3:00
|-  style="text-align:center; background:#cfc;"
| 2021-10-29||Win  ||align=left| Brian McGrath || KNOCK OUT 2021 vol.5  || Tokyo, Japan || KO (Left Hook)  || 2 || 0:18

|-  style="text-align:center; background:#cfc;"
| 2021-07-18|| Win ||align=left| Hijiri Tamura || KNOCK OUT 2021 vol.3 - BLACK Rules Championship Tournament, Final || Tokyo, Japan || Decision (Unanimous)  || 3||3:00 
|-
! style=background:white colspan=9 |

|-  style="text-align:center; background:#cfc;"
| 2021-03-13|| Win ||align=left| Kohei Tokeshi || KNOCK OUT ～The REBORN～ BLACK Rules Championship Tournament, Semi Final || Tokyo, Japan || KO (Front kick to the Body)  || 1 || 

|- align="center"  bgcolor="#cfc"
| 2020-12-06|| Win||align=left| T-98 || REBELS 69|| Tokyo, Japan || Decision (Unanimous) || 3|| 3:00

|- align="center"  bgcolor="#cfc"
| 2020-09-10|| Win||align=left| Kouki || Suk Wan Kingtong "Go for the top"|| Tokyo, Japan || TKO (Punches) || 1|| 1:27
|-
! style=background:white colspan=9 |

|- align="center"  bgcolor="#cfc"
| 2020-08-10|| Win||align=left| Koji Mori|| Rizin 23 – Calling Over|| Yokohama, Japan || TKO (Punches) || 1|| 1:28

|- align="center"  bgcolor="#cfc"
| 2020-02-23|| Win||align=left| Seigo Nishimura || RISE 137 || Tokyo, Japan || Decision (Unanimous) || 3|| 3:00

|- align="center" bgcolor="#fbb"
| 2019-07-05|| Loss ||align=left| Lee Sung-hyun || RISE 133 || Tokyo, Japan || Decision (Unanimous) || 5 || 3:00
|-
! style=background:white colspan=9 |

|- align="center"  bgcolor="#cfc"
| 2019-02-03|| Win||align=left| Takafumi Morita || RISE 130 || Tokyo, Japan || Decision (Unanimous) || 3|| 3:00

|- align="center"  bgcolor="#cfc"
| 2018-11-02|| Win||align=left| Kensuke Yabunaka || RISE 128 || Tokyo, Japan || KO (Left Cross)|| 2|| 2:38

|- align="center"  bgcolor="#cfc"
| 2018-08-12|| Win||align=left| Takahiro Okuyama|| Rizin 12 - Nagoya|| Nagoya, Japan || KO (Right Cross) || 2|| 2:30

|- align="center" bgcolor="#fbb"
| 2018-06-17|| Loss||align=left| Lee Sung-hyun || RISE 125 || Chiba, Japan || Ext.R Decision (Unanimous) || 4 || 3:00

|-  style="text-align:center; background:#fbb;"
| 2018-03-11 || Loss ||align=left| Hu Yafei || Kunlun Fight 70 || Sanya, China || Decision (Majority) || 3 ||3:00

|-  style="text-align:center; background:#fbb;"
| 2017-02-25 || Loss ||align=left| Hinata || K-1 World GP 2017 Lightweight Championship Tournament || Tokyo, Japan || Decision (Unanimous) || 3 ||3:00

|- align="center"  bgcolor="#cfc"
| 2016-12-03 || Win ||align=left| Zhao Yan|| Wu Lin Feng 2016: WLF x Krush - China vs Japan|| Zhengzhou, China || Decision (Unanimous) || 3 || 3:00

|- align="center"  bgcolor="#fbb"
| 2016-09-30 || Loss||align=left| Yu Hirono|| Krush 69 || Tokyo, Japan || Decision (Unanimous) || 3 || 3:00

|- align="center"  bgcolor="#cfc"
| 2016-07-09 || Win||align=left| Liu Lei || EM Legend 10 || China || Decision || 3 || 3:00 

|- align="center"  bgcolor="#cfc"
| 2016-06-05 || Win||align=left| Naimjon Tukhtaboev|| EM Legend 9 || Chengdu, China || TKO  || 3 || 

|- align="center"  bgcolor="#fbb"
| 2016-04-24 || Loss||align=left| Kazuya Akimoto || K-1 World GP 2016 -60kg Japan Tournament || Tokyo, Japan || Decision (Majority) || 3 || 3:00

|- align="center"  bgcolor="#cfc"
| 2015-12-04 || Win||align=left| Masato Uchiyama|| Krush 61 || Tokyo, Japan || KO (Left Hook) || 2 || 1:11

|- align="center"  bgcolor="#cfc"
| 2015-09-22 || Win||align=left| Tian Xin || K-1 World GP 2015 Survival Wars || Tokyo, Japan || Decision (Unanimous) || 3 || 3:00

|- align="center"  bgcolor="#fbb"
| 2015-05-04 || Loss||align=left| TOMOYUKI || Krush 54 || Tokyo, Japan || Decision (Majority) || 3 || 3:00

|- align="center"  bgcolor="#fbb"
| 2015-02-06 || Loss ||align=left| Hiroki Nakajima || Krush 51, -70kg Championship Tournament Semi Final || Tokyo, Japan || Decision (Unanimous) || 3 || 3:00

|- align="center"  bgcolor="#cfc"
| 2014-11-03 || Win||align=left| Jiao Fukai || K-1 World GP 2014 -65kg Championship Tournament || Tokyo, Japan || Decision (Unanimous) || 3 || 3:00

|- align="center"  bgcolor="#cfc"
| 2014-08-09 || Win||align=left| Asami Zaurus || Krush 44 || Tokyo, Japan || Decision (Majority) || 3 || 3:00

|- align="center"  bgcolor="#cfc"
| 2014-04-15 || Win||align=left| Onder Ural || Krush 40 || Tokyo, Japan || Decision (Unanimous) || 3 || 3:00

|- align="center"  bgcolor="#cfc"
| 2013-12-14 || Win||align=left| Hideaki Kikawa || Krush 35 || Tokyo, Japan || Decision (Unanimous) || 3 || 3:00

|- align="center"  bgcolor="#fbb"
| 2013-09-01 || Loss ||align=left| Yoshihiro Sato || Krush 32 || Nagoya, Japan || Decision (Unanimous) || 3 || 3:00

|- align="center"  bgcolor="#cfc"
| 2013-05-12 || Win||align=left| Yoichi Yamazaki || Krush 28 || Tokyo, Japan || Decision (Majority) || 3 || 3:00

|- align="center"  bgcolor="#fbb"
| 2013-01-14 || Loss ||align=left| Yuta Kubo || Krush Grand Prix 2013, Semi Final || Tokyo, Japan || Decision (Unanimous) || 3 || 3:00

|- align="center"  bgcolor="#cfc"
| 2013-01-14 || Win||align=left| Keita Makihira || Krush Grand Prix 2013, Quarter Final || Tokyo, Japan || Decision (Unanimous) || 3 || 3:00

|- align="center"  bgcolor="#cfc"
| 2012-11-10 || Win||align=left| Taisei Kondo || Krush 24, YOUTH GP 2012 -70kg Final || Tokyo, Japan || Ext.R KO (Right Cross) || 4 || 1:36
|-
! style=background:white colspan=9 |

|- align="center"  bgcolor="#cfc"
| 2012-09-09 || Win||align=left| Kazuya Akimoto|| Krush YOUTH GP 2012 -70kg Semi Final || Tokyo, Japan || Ext.R KO (Right Cross) || 4 || 

|- align="center"  bgcolor="#fbb"
| 2012-07-21 || Loss ||align=left| TOMOYUKI || Krush 20 || Tokyo, Japan || Ext.R Decision (Unanimous) || 4 || 3:00

|- align="center"  bgcolor="#cfc"
| 2012-06-03 || Win||align=left| Hareruya || Bigbang 9 || Tokyo, Japan || KO (Left Hook to the Body) || 2 || 2:35

|- align="center"  bgcolor="#cfc"
| 2012-03-17 || Win||align=left| Taisei Kondo || Krush 17 || Tokyo, Japan || Decision (Unanimous) || 3 || 3:00

|- align="center"  bgcolor="#fbb"
| 2011-12-11 || Loss ||align=left| Yasuhiro Kido || Big Bang 7 || Tokyo, Japan || KO (spinning backfist) || 2 || 2:24

|-  style="text-align:center; background:#fbb;"
| 2011-09-25 || Loss ||align=left| Yuya Yamamoto || K-1 World MAX 2011 –70 kg Japan Tournament Quarter Final || Osaka, Japan || Decision (Unanimous) || 3 || 3:00

|- align="center"  bgcolor="#fbb"
| 2011-07-16|| Loss||align=left| Yutaro Yamauchi || Krush -70kg inaugural Championship Tournament Semi Final  || Tokyo, Japan || Ext.R Decision (Split) || 4|| 3:00

|- align="center"  bgcolor="#cfc"
| 2011-05-29|| Win ||align=left| Yuya Yamamoto || Krush -70kg inaugural Championship Tournament Quarter Final  || Tokyo, Japan || Decision (Unanimous) || 3|| 3:00

|- align="center"  bgcolor="#fbb"
| 2010-12-30|| Loss||align=left| Yusuke Ikei || World Victory Road Presents: Soul of Fight|| Tokyo, Japan || KO (Left Knee) || 2|| 0:48

|- align="center"  bgcolor="#cfc"
| 2010-05-27|| Win||align=left| Masato Uchiyama || Krush.7 || Tokyo, Japan || KO (Right Cross) || 3|| 1:09

|- align="center"  bgcolor="#cfc"
| 2010-03-27|| Win||align=left| Yuuki|| K-1 WORLD MAX 2010 ～-70kg Japan Tournament～ || Saitama, Japan || KO (3 Knockdowns/Punches) || 2|| 1:48

|- align="center"  bgcolor="#cfc"
| 2009-11-27|| Win||align=left| Yudate Nagawa || J-NETWORK GET REAL in J-WORLD FINAL ～Invading || Tokyo, Japan || KO (Punches) || 1|| 1:43

|- align="center"  bgcolor="#cfc"
| 2008-08-29|| Win||align=left| Christopher Nishizawa|| K-1 KOSHIEN KING OF UNDER 18 ～FINAL16～ || Tokyo, Japan || KO (2 Knockdowns/Knee) || 3|| 2:05

|- align="center"  bgcolor="#fbb"
| 2008-07-20|| Loss||align=left| Kenichi Hashimoto|| MAJKF BREAK THROUGH-5 || Tokyo, Japan || Decision (Unanimous) || 3|| 3:00

|-
| colspan=9 | Legend:    

|- align="center"  bgcolor="#cfc"
| 2009-08-10|| Win||align=left| Mitsuki Saito || K-1 Koshien FINAL 16, Final|| Tokyo, Japan ||Ext.R TKO (Doctor Stoppage) || 2|| 0:46
|-
! style=background:white colspan=9 |

|- align="center"  bgcolor="#cfc"
| 2009-08-10|| Win||align=left| Masaya Matsuhana || K-1 Koshien FINAL 16, Semi Final|| Tokyo, Japan || Decision (Unanimous) || 1|| 2:00

|- align="center"  bgcolor="#cfc"
| 2009-08-10|| Win||align=left| Taichi Sato || K-1 Koshien FINAL 16, Quarter Final|| Tokyo, Japan || Decision (Unanimous) || 1|| 2:00

|- align="center"  bgcolor="#cfc"
| 2009-06-28|| Win||align=left| Akihiro Nakamura || K-1 Koshien Kanto Region || Tokyo, Japan || Decision (Unanimous) || || 2:00

|-
| colspan=9 | Legend:

References

Living people
1991 births
Japanese male kickboxers